Helmut Schiessl (born 25 February 1972) is a German male mountain runner, twice world champion at the World Long Distance Mountain Running Championships (2004).

References

External links
 

1972 births
Living people
German male long-distance runners
German male mountain runners
German sky runners
World Long Distance Mountain Running Championships winners
20th-century German people